Guildford School of Acting (GSA) is a drama school in Guildford, Surrey, England. It is an academic school in the University of Surrey. It is a member of the Federation of Drama Schools.

Overview
It is part of the University of Surrey and offers a range of undergraduate and postgraduate courses in acting, musical theatre, and production. In addition to undergraduate programmes, GSA also offers postgraduate programmes, including a Master of Fine Arts (MFA) in Acting, a Master of Fine Arts (MFA) in Musical Theatre, and a Master of Arts (MA) in Theatre Practices.

The university also hosts the National Resource Centre for Dance established in 1982.

Alumni

References

External links
GSA website

Drama schools in the United Kingdom
Education in Guildford
Educational institutions established in 1935
1935 establishments in England
Arts organizations established in 1935